Marine stratocumulus is a type of stratocumulus cloud that form in the stable air off the west coast of major land masses. The Earth spins on its axis, which results in the Coriolis force pushing the ocean surface water away from the coast in the mid-latitudes. This results in upwelling of cold water from below that creates a pool of cool water at the surface, which in turn cools the air directly above it. The surface cooling results in a large temperature inversion at the top of the marine layer. As the temperature is cooled to the dewpoint, water vapor condenses upon available cloud condensation nuclei, and forms a cloud. The stability of the marine layer prevents deep convection, and thus stratiform clouds are formed.

Climate scientists are currently investigating the detailed structure of marine stratocumulus clouds in an attempt to understand their effect on the climate.

See also 
 Oceanic climate
 Actinoform cloud

References 

Cumulus
Stratus